Cherdaklinsky District  is an administrative and municipal district (raion), one of the twenty-one in Ulyanovsk Oblast, Russia. It is located in the northeast of the oblast. Its administrative center is the urban locality (a work settlement) of Cherdakly. Population: 41,449 (2010 Census);  The population of Cherdakly accounts for 27.6% of the district's total population.

References

Notes

Sources

Districts of Ulyanovsk Oblast